, stylized as daiki kasho,  is a Japanese video game composer who has worked on the Gran Turismo, F-Zero, Wangan Midnight, and King of Fighters series.

List of known songs
"EXiNA Album: SHiENA" (performed by EXiNA, produced by daiki kasho)
"ENDiNG MiRAGE" - World's End Harem, EXiNA Album: ENDiNG MiRAGE (performed, lyrics and vocals by EXiNA, composed and arranged by daiki kasho)
"CARPET" - EXiNA Album: ENDiNG MiRAGE (performed, lyrics and vocals by EXiNA, composed and arranged by daiki kasho)
"All my life" - Gran Turismo 6 (vocals by Ray Hikari)
"Looking for you" - Gran Turismo 6
"Place in this world" - Gran Turismo 6 (vocals by Ray Hikari)
"AL1V3" - Gran Turismo 6
"We are one" - Gran Turismo 6
"WAKE UP THE WORLD" - fade Album: Ten (performed by fade, lyrics by Naoto Matohara, music by rui and daiki kasho)
 Kasho wrote an untitled song for the Gran Turismo 5 E3 2010 Trailer, which was later named "5OUL ON D!SPLAY" through a competition held by Polyphony Digital. - Gran Turismo 5 (titled by MajanoX, lyrics and vocals by Jonathan Underdown from fade, music, programming and all instruments played by daiki kasho)
"Day to Live" - Gran Turismo 5 (lyrics and vocals by Jonathan Underdown from fade, music, programming and all instruments played by daiki kasho)
"Shadows of Our Past" - Gran Turismo 5 (vocals by Jonathan Underdown from fade)
"Break Away" - fade Album: To Find A Better Tomorrow (performed by fade, lyrics by rui, music by rui and daiki kasho)
"SURV1V3" - Gran Turismo 5 Prologue (vocals by Jonathan Underdown from fade, lyrics by ayesha cole, music, programming, guitar, bass and engineered by daiki kasho)
"Edge of the World" - Gran Turismo 5 Prologue (lyrics and vocals by Jonathan Underdown from fade, music, programming, guitar, bass and engineered by daiki kasho)
"Flow" - Gran Turismo 5 Prologue (vocals by Jonathan Underdown from fade)
"Autoload" - Gran Turismo HD Concept
"OVER NIGHT" - Le Chevalier D'Eon (performed, lyrics and vocals by Aya, composed by Aya and daiki kasho, arranged by daiki kasho)
"Regret (Another Day)" - The King of Fighters: Another Day (performed by Dakota Star, composed by daiki kasho)
"Soul Surfer" - Gran Turismo 4 (performed by Dakota Star, vocals by Chiaki, lyrics by Alan Brey, music by daiki kasho, arranged by tasuku)
"Good Days Bad Days" - Gran Turismo 4 (performed by Dakota Star, lyrics and vocals by Alan Brey, music by daiki kasho)
"What to Believe" - Gran Turismo 4 (performed by Dakota Star, vocals by Alan Brey and Chiaki, lyrics by Alan Brey, music by daiki kasho, arranged by tasuku)
"My Precious" - Gran Turismo 4
"Break Down" - Gran Turismo 4 (performed by Dakota Star, vocals by Chiaki, lyrics by Alan Brey, music by daiki kasho and Alan Brey, arranged by tasuku)
"Wicked" - Gran Turismo 4 (performed by Dakota Star, lyrics and vocals by Alan Brey, music by daiki kasho)
"It's All About You" - Gran Turismo 4 (performed by Dakota Star, vocals by Chiaki, lyrics by Alan Brey, music by daiki kasho and Alan Brey, guitar played by kansei from fade, drums played by rui from fade)
"F-Zero GX/AX Original Soundtrack: Disc #1" - F-Zero GX/AX (all tracks composed by daiki kasho, all lyrics by Alan Brey)
"2/K" - Gran Turismo 4 Prologue
"Running in the Dark" - Tokyo Xtreme Racer 3 (performed by Dakota Star, vocals by Chiaki, lyrics by Alan Brey, arranged by daiki kasho and Alan Brey)
"Please" - Tokyo Xtreme Racer: Drift (performed by LEO, lyrics and vocals by arvin homa aya, composed by daiki kasho, produced by Motoya Shiraishi)
"Continuation" - Gran Turismo Concept
"Heaven" - Gran Turismo Concept
"Turbo" - Gran Turismo Concept
"Glowl" - Gran Turismo 3: A-Spec (composed and arranged by daiki kasho)
"Mirage" - Gran Turismo 3: A-Spec (composed and arranged by daiki kasho)
"Strike Breaker" - Gran Turismo 3: A-Spec (composed and arranged by daiki kasho)
"Obscure" - Gran Turismo 3: A-Spec (composed and arranged by daiki kasho)
"Sky Scraper" - Gran Turismo 3: A-Spec (composed and arranged by daiki kasho)
"Tense Up" - Omega Boost (composed and performed by Shingo Okumura, arranged by Shingo Okumura and daiki kasho)
"Hit It" - Wangan Midnight PS2
"Call Me Now" - Tokyo Xtreme Racer: Drift 2 (vocals by Dakota Star) (intro theme)
"Find Your Dream" - Kaidō Battle 2: Chain Reaction (performed by LEO)

References

External links
 Interview at RocketBaby
 
 

1976 births
Japanese composers
Living people
Nintendo people
Video game composers